Chloe Francesca Hannah Birch (born 16 September 1995) is an English badminton player. She was introduced to badminton through school and started playing at age eight at Abbeydale Badminton Club. Birch received the Michael Vaughan Award from Silverdale School, and competed at the Australian Youth Olympic Festival in 2013. She was the runner-up in 2016 English National Championships Women's singles. Birch was part of the English team that won the mixed team bronze at the 2018 Commonwealth Games in Gold Coast. She won the women's doubles silver medal at the 2019 European Games partnered with Lauren Smith.

Birch graduated from Loughborough University with sport and exercise science degree.

Achievements

Commonwealth Games 

Women's doubles

European Games 
Women's doubles

European Championships 
Women's doubles

BWF World Tour (1 title, 1 runner-up) 
The BWF World Tour, which was announced on 19 March 2017 and implemented in 2018, is a series of elite badminton tournaments sanctioned by the Badminton World Federation (BWF). The BWF World Tour is divided into levels of World Tour Finals, Super 1000, Super 750, Super 500, Super 300, and the BWF Tour Super 100.

Women's doubles

BWF International Challenge/Series (7 titles, 10 runners-up) 
Women's singles

Women's doubles

  BWF International Challenge tournament
  BWF International Series tournament

References

External links 
 
 

1995 births
Living people
Sportspeople from Preston, Lancashire
English female badminton players
Badminton players at the 2018 Commonwealth Games
Badminton players at the 2022 Commonwealth Games
Commonwealth Games silver medallists for England
Commonwealth Games bronze medallists for England
Commonwealth Games medallists in badminton
Badminton players at the 2019 European Games
European Games silver medalists for Great Britain
European Games medalists in badminton
Badminton players at the 2020 Summer Olympics
Olympic badminton players of Great Britain
Medallists at the 2018 Commonwealth Games
Medallists at the 2022 Commonwealth Games